The Battle of Köbölkút was fought on August 5, 1663 as part of the Austro-Turkish War (1663–1664), between a Habsburg army under the command of the Hungarian Ádám Forgách and an Ottoman army under the command of Grand Vizier Fazıl Ahmed Pasha. The battle took place near Köbölkút, Kingdom of Hungary in present day Slovakia and was an absolute Ottoman victory. The Ottomans captured the town and also large territories in modern day Slovakia.

References

Sources
Ferenc Tóth, Saint Gotthard 1664, une bataille Européenne, Éditions Lavauzelle, 2007. 
Sándor Szilágyi, A Magyar Nemzet Története IV. fejezet

Conflicts in 1663
1663 in the Habsburg monarchy
17th century in Austria
Battles involving Hungary
Battles involving Austria
Battles of the Ottoman–Hungarian Wars
Battles involving the Ottoman Empire
Battles of the Austro-Turkish War (1663–64)
Military history of Hungary
1663 in the Ottoman Empire
17th century in Hungary
History of the Nitra Region